Michael Martin Zupancic (born December 14, 1989) is a former American football long snapper. He played college football at Eastern Michigan.

Professional career
On May 3, 2013, he signed with the New England Patriots as undrafted free agent. On August 2, 2013, Zupancic was released by the New England Patriots. On August 5, 2013, Zupancic was re-signed by the Patriots. On August 26, 2013, he was cut by the Patriots.

References

External links
Eastern Michigan Eagles bio
New England Patriots bio

Living people
New England Patriots players
Eastern Michigan Eagles football players
1989 births